The 2004 San Francisco Board of Supervisors elections occurred on November 2, 2004. Seven of the eleven seats were contested in this election. Six incumbents and one open seat were up for election.

Municipal elections in California are officially non-partisan, though most candidates in San Francisco do receive funding and support from various political parties. This is the first Board of Supervisors election in San Francisco to implement ranked-choice voting.

Results

District 1 

This district consists of the Richmond District. Incumbent supervisor Jake McGoldrick ran for reelection.

Ranked-choice vote distribution

District 2 

District 2 consists of the Marina, Pacific Heights, the Presidio, part of Russian Hill, and Sea Cliff. Incumbent supervisor Michela Alioto-Pier was seeking her first election after being appointed by Mayor Gavin Newsom in the wake of his election as mayor.

District 3 

District 3 consists of the northeastern corner of San Francisco, including Chinatown, the Financial District, Fisherman's Wharf, Nob Hill, North Beach, and Telegraph Hill. Incumbent supervisor Aaron Peskin was seeking reelection.

District 5 

District 5 consists of the Fillmore, Haight-Ashbury, Hayes Valley, Japantown, UCSF, and the Western Addition. Incumbent supervisor Matt Gonzalez did not seek reelection.

Ranked-choice vote distribution

District 7 

District 7 consists of City College, Forest Hill, Lake Merced, Mount Davidson, Parkmerced, San Francisco State University, St. Francis Wood, and Twin Peaks. Incumbent supervisor Sean Elsbernd was seeking his first election after he was appointed to the seat in the wake of his predecessor Tony Hall's resignation.

Ranked-choice vote distribution

District 9 

District 9 consists of Bernal Heights, the Inner Mission, and part of the Portola. Incumbent supervisor Tom Ammiano ran for reelection.

District 11 

District 11 consists of the Excelsior District, Ingleside, Oceanview, and the Outer Mission. Incumbent supervisor Gerardo Sandoval ran for reelection.

Ranked-choice vote distribution

References

External links 
City and County of San Francisco Department of Elections

San Francisco Board of Supervisors
Elections Board of Supervisors
San Francisco Board of Supervisors
Board of Supervisors 2004